"Through Your Eyes" is the lead single, released on July 29, 2016, from Britt Nicole's eponymous fifth album. It appears on WOW Hits 2018.

Background
The song was conceived by Nicole after wanting to constantly better herself. She explained: "The song is about seeing ourselves through the eyes of God and finally finding life and purpose."

Composition
"Through Your Eyes" is originally in the key of B Major, with a tempo of 96 beats per minute. Written in common time, Nicole's vocal range spans from F#3 to D#5 during the song.

Music video
A lyric video for the song premiered on Aug 15, 2016 on YouTube.

Credits and personnel
Credits adapted from Tidal.
David Garcia – producer
Ben Glover – composer & lyricist
Britt Nicole – composer & lyricist

Live performances
Nicole performed the song Live on Air1.

Charts

Weekly charts

Year-end charts

References

2016 singles
2016 songs
Britt Nicole songs
Songs written by Ben Glover